Huta Kryształowa  is a settlement in the administrative district of Gmina Lubaczów, within Lubaczów County, Subcarpathian Voivodeship, in south-eastern Poland, close to the border with Ukraine.

The settlement has a population of 80.

References

Villages in Lubaczów County